The 1951 European Amateur Boxing Championships were held in Milan, Italy, from 14 to 19 May. The ninth edition of the bi-annual competition was organised by the European governing body for amateur boxing, EABA. There were 132 fighters from 20 countries participating.

Medal winners

Medal table

External links
Results
EABA Boxing
Amateur Boxing

1951 in boxing
1951 in Italian sport
1951
International boxing competitions hosted by Italy
Sports competitions in Milan
1951 Amateur Boxing European Championships
May 1951 sports events in Europe